The Xuzhou–Yancheng high-speed railway is a high-speed railway in China.

History
In November 2014, construction was expected to take 4.5 years. The line opened on 16 December 2019.

Route
From Xuzhou East, the line heads southeast and serves Guanyin Airport, Suining, and Suqian. The line subsequently meets the Suzhou–Huai'an railway and follows its route, but the two lines don't intersect. Passengers can change between them at Siyang. The line then heads south to Huai'an East, where it joins the Lianyungang–Zhenjiang high-speed railway. After leaving Huai'an, the line heads east to serve Funing South and Jianhu. At Jianhu, passengers can change to the Xinyi–Yancheng railway. Finally, the line terminates at Yancheng. In the future, high-speed services will continue south on the currently under construction Yancheng–Nantong high-speed railway.

Stations

References

High-speed railway lines in China
Railway lines opened in 2019